Jack McCall, Desperado is a 1953 American Western film directed by Sidney Salkow and starring George Montgomery. It portrays the historical shooting of Wild Bill Hickok by Jack McCall in 1876.

The film's sets were designed by the art director Paul Palmentola.

Plot
Jack McCall is a Southerner who joins the Union during the civil war. When he encounters three Confederate soldiers posing as Yankees, one of which is named Spargo, Jack tells them the place where the headquarters is located. Soon after he is tried as a spy. When Jack manages to escape, his cousin Bat McCall and Wild Bill Hickok kill his parents and plan to get hold of the McCall plantation and money. After the war Jack tries to prove his innocence and asks Spargo to testify. Spargo first agrees, but when Jack is captured again, Spargo decides to join Hickok and Bat. With the help of Rose Griffith, Jack manages to escape again and hopes to clear his name. Meanwhile, Hickok, Bat and Spargo have left for Kansas City. In search for gold, they plan to destroy the Sioux Indians. Jack, while still trying to clear his name, becomes aware of their plans and tries to stop them.

Cast
 George Montgomery as Jack McCall  
 Angela Stevens as Rose Griffith 
 Douglas Kennedy as 'Wild' Bill Hickok 
 James Seay as Bat McCall  
 Eugene Iglesias as Grey Eagle  
 Willam Tannen as Spargo  
 Jay Silverheels as Red Cloud  
 John Hamilton as Col. Cornish 
 Selmer Jackson as Col. Brand

Production
In November 1951 Katzan announced the film as part of his slate for the upcoming year.

In January 1952 Katzman announced that George Montgomery would make two films for the producer, this and The Pathfinder.

In April Douglas Kennedy was cast as Wild Bill Hickok.

References

Bibliography
 Douglas Brode. Shooting Stars of the Small Screen: Encyclopedia of TV Western Actors, 1946–Present. University of Texas Press, 2010.

External links
 

1953 films
1950s historical films
1953 Western (genre) films
1950s English-language films
American historical films
American Western (genre) films
Films directed by Sidney Salkow
Films set in the 1870s
Columbia Pictures films
1950s American films